Gerald T. Whelan  (May 14, 1925 – January 2, 1993) was an American politician who served as the 30th lieutenant governor of Nebraska from 1975 to 1979.

Whelan was born in Hastings, Nebraska on May 14, 1925.  He graduated from University of Nebraska–Lincoln, obtained a law degree from Creighton University, and practiced law in Hastings.

In 1960, Whelan won the Democratic nomination to run for Nebraska's 1st congressional district, and lost to incumbent Republican Phillip Hart Weaver in the general election.

Whelan, with the endorsement of Democratic governor J. James Exon, beat longtime Nebraska politician Terry Carpenter in the Democratic primary in May 1974 for lieutenant governor, and went on to win the general election.  In the 1978 election, Whelan ran for Nebraska Governor, but lost to Charles Thone.

Personal
Whelan married Virginia Kellison (1927–2010) in 1948 and had four children together.

References

1925 births
1993 deaths
Lieutenant Governors of Nebraska
People from Hastings, Nebraska
Nebraska Democrats
20th-century American politicians